Ernst Sebastian von Manstein (1678 – 24 June 1747) was a Baltic German in Russian Empire military service, also a statesman.

He was in Russian Empire service since 1719.

1736–1738 he was General-Governor of Governorate of Estonia.

References

1678 births
1747 deaths
Military personnel of the Russian Empire
18th-century military personnel from the Russian Empire
Governors of the Russian Empire governorates
Baltic-German people